Elle Simone, also known as Elle Simone Scott, is an American chef, culinary producer, test cook, and food stylist. She is founder of the mentoring organization SheChef.

Early life and education 
Simone was born LaShawnda Sherise Simone Scott and grew up in Detroit, Michigan in a middle-class 7th-Day Adventist family. She attended Eastern Michigan University. Her first cooking job was at a kosher bakery in Oak Park, MI. Before entering the culinary field, Simone worked as a social worker in Detroit.  She moonlighted as a prep cook. She attended Culinary Institute of New York. She has a master's degree in entertainment business.

Culinary career 
At age 28, Simone lost her job as a social worker, her car, and her home during the 2008 recession. She took a job on a cruise ship as a cook for two years. In 2009 she moved to New York, working at a women's shelter, and in 2010 attended culinary school. She did an internship with Food Network. She worked as a food stylist for Cabot Creamery and The Chew. She worked in culinary production for Cook's Country, Food Network, Bravo, and Cooking Channel.

Simone was the first African American woman to appear as a regular host on the PBS television show America's Test Kitchen starting in 2016. She is a test cook and food stylist for the show. She also develops videos for the show's online cooking school.

She was featured in a segment of NBC's The Hub Today in 2018 and in 2019 hosted 28 Days of Edna, a monthlong America's Test Kitchen series focussed on Edna Lewis.

Simone is a member of the board of Women Chefs and Restaurateurs. She has said she wants to become the "culinary Oprah."

Philanthropy 
Simone founded SheChef, a mentoring and networking organization for women of color in the culinary field, in 2013. As of November 2018 it had over 1000 members. She was motivated to do so after realizing that although 90% of her culinary school classmates had been women or persons of color, this group was underrepresented among chefs.

Personal life 
Simone is a survivor of ovarian cancer. She was diagnosed in 2016 at the age of 40.

References 

American chefs
American women chefs
People from Detroit
Living people
Year of birth missing (living people)
Eastern Michigan University alumni
21st-century American women